Ken Michelman (born May 23, 1955) is an American actor primarily known for his role as Abner Goldstein on the TV series The White Shadow.  He also played Gary Greenberg, Cindy Brady's love interest on the short-lived Brady Bunch spin-off, The Bradys. He also appeared on Grey's Anatomy.

Michelman played basketball at the University of Denver on the same mid 1970s team with David Adkins who would later become the comedian Sinbad. After injuring his ankle, he transferred to Skidmore College.

Michelman lives in Sherman Oaks, California, making occasional acting appearances.

Filmography

References

External links

1955 births
Living people
American male television actors
American male film actors
Male actors from New York (state)